Under Gabon's penal code, both men and women may have more than one spouse; however, in practice typically only men take multiple spouses. Before contracting a marriage, the couple must state whether they intend to pursue a polygamous relationship in the future. Men may later retract their decision and opt for polygamy if they desire, but women do not have this option.

References

See also
Polyandry

Society of Gabon
Gabon